Emmanuel Héré de Corny (12 October 1705 – burial: 2 February 1763) was the court architect to Stanisław Leszczyński, Duke of Lorraine and former King of Poland at his capital of Nancy.

Corny, who was born in Nancy, is famous for the harmonious suite of axial spaces he developed, extending from the Place Stanislas to the Palais du Gouvernement; the sequence is a prime example of eighteenth-century urbanism.

He died, aged 57, in Lunéville.

References

1705 births
1763 deaths
People from Nancy, France
French Baroque architects
18th-century French architects
Rococo architects
Polish Baroque architects